Morava may refer to:

Rivers
 Great Morava (Velika Morava; or simply Morava), a river in central Serbia, and its tributaries:
 South Morava (Južna Morava)
 Binač Morava (Binačka Morava)
 West Morava (Zapadna Morava)
 Morava (river), a river in the Czech Republic, Austria and Slovakia

Places
 , a village in the Svishtov Municipality, Bulgaria
 Morava (Kočevje), a village in the municipality of Kočevje, Slovenia
 Morava (Serbian Cyrillic: Морава), a former name for Gnjilane (Albanian: Gjilan)
 Suva Morava ("Dry Morava"), a village in the municipality of Vladičin Han, Serbia
 Dolní Morava ("Lower Morava"), a municipality and village in the Ústí nad Orlicí District, Czech Republic
 Malá Morava ("Little Morava"), a municipality and village in the Šumperk District, Czech Republic
 , a mountain in southeast Albania, near Korçë
 Morava Banovina, a province of the Kingdom of Yugoslavia between 1929 and 1941
 Donja Morava ("Lower Morava"), a region in Kosovo
 Gornja Morava ("Upper Morava"), a region in Kosovo
 Morava Valley, a geographical area in Serbia around the Great Morava (or simply Morava) and its tributaries
 Lower Morava Valley
 Moravia (wine region)
 Moravia, a historic country comprising the east of the Czech Republic
 Great Moravia, early-medieval Empire in Central Europe

Other
 Morava (cigarette), a Serbian brand
 Morava Airport, an airport in Serbia
 Let L-200 Morava, a two-engine Czech touring and light passenger aircraft
 LRSVM Morava, a Serbian multiple rocket launcher system
 Jack Morava (born 1944), American mathematician

See also
 Moravica (disambiguation) ("little Morava")
 Moravice (disambiguation)
 Morawa (disambiguation)
 Moravia (disambiguation)
 Moravany (disambiguation)
 Morávka (disambiguation)
 Moravec (disambiguation)
 Moravčík, a surname